Man from Tangier (released in the United States as Thunder over Tangier) is a 1957 British crime film directed by Lance Comfort and starring Robert Hutton, Lisa Gastoni and Martin Benson.

Plot summary
A criminal flees from Tangier to London with forged money plates, leading to the gang he works for sending a dangerous woman to pursue him.

Main cast
 Robert Hutton as Chuck Collins
 Lisa Gastoni as Michele
 Martin Benson as Voss
 Derek Sydney as Darracq
 Leonard Sachs as Heinrich
 Emerton Court as Armstrong
 Richard Shaw as Johnny
 Robert Raglan as Inspector Meredith
 Harold Berens as Sammy
 Jack Allen as Rex
 Michael Balfour as Spade Murphy
 Frank Forsyth as Sergeant Irons
 Reginald Hearne as Walters
 Fred Lake as Hotel Porter
 Alex Gallier as Max
 Marianne Stone as Woman in Hotel
 Ronnie Clark as Coster

Release
Man in Tangier was cut by the British Board of Film Classification to 67 minutes running time, in order to achieve a "U" classification. The film premiered at Odeon Marble Arch in London on 27 January 1957, where it ran as a double bill together with Monkey on My Back.

In April 2011 the film was released on DVD as a double bill together with director Lance Comfort's 1961 film The Breaking Point.

References

External links

1957 films
British crime films
1957 crime films
Films directed by Lance Comfort
Films set in Tangier
Films set in London
Republic Pictures films
1950s English-language films
1950s British films